The Beizhengjie Christian Church, formerly known as Trinity Church, is a neo-Gothic Protestant church located on Huangxing North Road of Changsha, Hunan province, China, formerly belonging to the Episcopal Church of the United States.

History
It was built in 1905 by the Protestant Episcopal Church Mission and formerly called Trinity Church under the Church of China, it was designed by the bishop Dr. Alfred A. Gilman, and built of big blocks of rough granite. It was ruined in 1910. The rebuilding began in 1911 and ended completely in 1915.

During the Xinhai Revolution, General Huang Xing took refuge here, he wrote "To worship Holy Christ, we must be devout. To save the world, he lived among the low."

After the founding of PRC in 1949, it was taken as the match storage of Changsha Department Store Company and then as the celebration center of Hunan Finance Company.

In 2002, it was listed as a "Historical and Cultural Sites Protected at the Provincial Level" by the Hunan government.

On December 20, 2004, it again opened to pilgrim.

References

External links
  

Churches in Changsha
Former Anglican churches in China
1905 establishments in China
Churches completed in 1905
Gothic Revival church buildings in China
Tourist attractions in Changsha
Protestant churches in China